This is a list of women who are or have been members of the London Assembly'''.

 List of female members of the London Assembly

Notes

See also 
 All-women shortlists
 Parliament (Qualification of Women) Act 1918
 Widow's succession

 Women
Lists of political office-holders in London
Lists of women politicians in the United Kingdom
Women in London